Edward Cotter (27 December 1887 – 1973) was a Canadian long-distance runner. He competed in the men's marathon at the 1908 Summer Olympics.

References

Further reading
  
  
  
  

1887 births
1973 deaths
Athletes (track and field) at the 1908 Summer Olympics
Canadian male long-distance runners
Canadian male marathon runners
Olympic track and field athletes of Canada
Place of birth missing